Yated (lit. Stake) is a moshav in southern Israel. Located in Hevel Shalom, it falls under the jurisdiction of Eshkol Regional Council.

History
The village was founded in 1982 by a gar'in who intended to settle in Sinai.

References

Moshavim
Gaza envelope
Populated places in Southern District (Israel)
Populated places established in 1982
1982 establishments in Israel